Ruben Carrapatoso (born 29 July 1981 in São Paulo) is a Brazilian race driver, that competed in various series, including the Stock Car Brasil and in one season of the Formula 3 Euro Series. He was CIK-FIA world champion in 1998.

References

1981 births
Living people
Racing drivers from São Paulo
Brazilian racing drivers
Formula Ford drivers
Formula 3 Sudamericana drivers
Italian Formula Renault 2.0 drivers
British Formula Renault 2.0 drivers
Formula Renault Argentina drivers
Formula 3 Euro Series drivers
A1 Grand Prix Rookie drivers
American Le Mans Series drivers
Stock Car Brasil drivers

Karting World Championship drivers